Abhijith (born 30 July 1963) is an Indian actor, singer, producer and director working in Kannada films. Starting his career as an actor in the late 1980s, he went on to act in many films through the 1990s and 2000s. He mainly played lead roles and villains in the 1990s and some supporting roles as well.

Career
Abhijith started his career in the late 1980s playing small roles in feature films. It was the 1990 release, College Hero,  that made him a successful villain of the Kannada film industry. He played villains even after being a successful hero in films such as Muddina Maava, One Man Army, and  Vairi.

Abhijith has acted in more than 150 films in the Kannada film industry.

As director
Abhijith's first directorial venture, Jodi No. 1, was a suspense and action movie, and the second one was Vishnu which had led to controversy with the title.

As producer

Abhijith has produced films under the banner Shree Balaji Creations.

Playback singer

Television
Abhijith is the host of the popular show Aksharamale, which aired on Udaya TV. Aksharamaale is a Kannada-language, singing talent show running for more than 15 years on Udaya TV. Abhijith has been the host of the show since 1997 with co-host and singer Sangeetha Ravishankar and Anuradha Bhat.

Awards

 1996 - Bharath Udyog Samastha Award for Best Actor Of The Year
 2010 - Abhinava Chathura

Selected filmography

TV Shows

References

Sources

 Vishnuvardhan & Abhijith
 Abhijith's Vishnu Title Rejected
 Abhijith Injured to head in VISHNU movie climax
 2
 Abhijith Filmogfraphy OneIndia
 ಅಭಿಜಿತ್ ಓರ್ವ ಪ್ರತಿಭಾವಂತ ನಟ
 Abhijith Fan Club
 3
 Abhijith Turns Director
 Abhijith's Youtube Channel
 Aksharamaale Programme

External links 
 

Male actors in Kannada cinema
Kannada film producers
Male actors from Bangalore
1963 births
Living people
People from Chitradurga
Film producers from Bangalore
Indian male film actors
20th-century Indian male actors
21st-century Indian male actors